Anwar M.S. Phillips (born October 25, 1982) is a former American football cornerback. He was signed by the New Orleans Saints as an undrafted free agent in 2006. He played college football at Penn State.

Phillips has also played for the Baltimore Ravens.

Early years
Phillips attended Northwest High School in Germantown, Maryland. He was named to The Washington Post'' All-League squad as a wide receiver in 2000 and 2001.

College career
Phillips was a two-year starter and was an All-Big Ten selection at Penn State. He helped the Nittany Lions lead the conference in pass efficiency defense in 2005, and made 104 tackles and seven interceptions in his collegiate career. There he earned a Bachelor of Science in labor and industrial relations in December 2005.

Professional career

New Orleans Saints
Phillips signed as an undrafted free agent with the New Orleans Saints following the 2006 NFL draft.  He saw playing time in 4 games during the preseason. Phillips began the season on the practice squad, but was promoted to the active roster mid-season. He was released at the end of training camp the following season.

Baltimore Ravens
Phillips signed as a free agent with the Baltimore Ravens on July 23, 2008. He spent the first half of the 2008 season on the practice squad before being promoted to active roster on November 1, 2008. He would play in the Ravens' week 9 win over Cleveland. Phillips was re-signed to a one-year future contract at the conclusion of the season. He was waived on June 18, 2009.

References

External links
Baltimore Ravens bio

1982 births
Living people
Players of American football from Maryland
American football cornerbacks
Penn State Nittany Lions football players
New Orleans Saints players
Baltimore Ravens players
Players of American football from St. Petersburg, Florida
People from Germantown, Maryland